Lianghekou Township is an rural township in Sangzhi County, Zhangjiajie, Hunan Province, China.

Administrative division
The township is divided into 14 villages, the following areas: Baizhuke Village, Zhangjia Village, Guanping Village, Yanbi Village, Zhujiagou Village, Tianjia Village, Xiadongjie Village, Wudutan Village, Bijia Village, Lianghekou Village, Tankou Village, Jiujie Village, Lishanpo Village, and Gexi Village (白竹科村、张家村、官坪村、岩壁村、朱家沟村、田家村、下洞街村、五渡潭村、笔家村、两河口村、潭口村、旧街村、栗山坡村、格溪村).

References

External links

Former towns and townships of Sangzhi County